The Bone Mountains are a mountain range in Elko County, Nevada.

References 

Mountain ranges of Nevada
Mountain ranges of Elko County, Nevada